Napecoetes is a genus of moths in the family Psychidae.

Species
Napecoetes belogramma (Turner, 1916)
Napecoetes crossospila (Turner, 1923)
Napecoetes chrysomitra (Turner, 1933)
Napecoetes scoteina (Turner, 1900)

References

Natural History Museum Lepidoptera generic names catalog

Psychidae
Psychidae genera